Down County Council was the authority responsible for local government in County Down, Northern Ireland.

History
Down County Council was formed under orders issued in accordance with the Local Government (Ireland) Act 1898 which came into effect on 18 April 1899. It was based at Downpatrick Courthouse throughout its existence. It was abolished in accordance with the Local Government Act (Northern Ireland) 1972 on 1 October 1973.

References

County councils of Northern Ireland